Tegba Othello Hunter (born May 28, 1986) is an American-Liberian professional basketball player  for Bayern Munich of the Basketball Bundesliga (BBL) and the EuroLeague. Hunter played four seasons of college basketball including two seasons for Hillsborough CC and two seasons for Ohio State University.

High school career
Hunter attended Richard J. Reynolds High School, in his hometown of Winston-Salem, North Carolina where he played high school basketball.

College career
After high school, Hunter attended Hillsborough Community College, in Tampa, Hillsborough County, FL for two years, and he became a part of the Ohio State University's 2006 "Thad Five" recruiting class. After playing two seasons at Ohio State University, with the Buckeyes, during which he managed to post the seventh-best single-season field-goal percentage in school history, he entered the 2008 NBA draft, in which he was not selected.

Professional career

NBA
Hunter joined the Atlanta Hawks' summer league squad in the summer of 2008. In five summer league games, he posted 13.2 points per game, 2.0 assists per game, 1.2 steals per game, and led his team with 6.2 rebounds per game. On August 11, 2008, the Hawks announced that they had signed Hunter to a contract. Hunter was waived by the Hawks in January 2010.

Europe
In 2012, after playing three months with the Ukrainian SuperLeague squad Azovmash Mariupol, he signed with the Spanish ACB League team Blancos de Rueda Valladolid. On August 26, 2013, Hunter officially signed a one-year deal with the Italian League team Montepaschi Siena.

On July 8, 2014, he signed a contract with the Greek League team Olympiacos. In his first season with the team, in 2014–15, Olympiacos advanced to the 2015 Final Four of the EuroLeague, where they lost in the EuroLeague Finals game to the host team Real Madrid. Olympiacos finished the season winning the 2014–15 Greek League championship, Hunter's first major title in his career, as they swept their arch rivals Panathinaikos, in the finals series of the Greek League playoffs. He also won the 2016 Greek League championship with Olympiacos.

On August 29, 2016, he signed a two-year deal with Real Madrid.

On July 13, 2017, Hunter signed a two-year contract with Russian club CSKA Moscow. On May 23, 2019, Hunter recorded a season-high 22 points, shooting 9-of-10 from the field, along with six rebounds in a 98–82 win over Zenit Saint Petersburg. Hunter went on to win the 2019 EuroLeague championship with CSKA.

On July 16, 2019, Hunter joined the Israeli team Maccabi Tel Aviv, signing a one-year deal with an option for another one. On December 12, 2019, Hunter recorded a EuroLeague career-high 20 points, along with seven rebounds in a 90–80 win over his former team CSKA Moscow.

On February 3, 2020, Hunter signed a 1+1-year contract extension with Maccabi. On June 24, 2021, Hunter amicably parted ways with the Israeli club.

On July 21, 2021, he has signed with Bayern Munich of the Basketball Bundesliga (BBL).

Career statistics

|-
| align="left" | 2008–09
| align="left" | Atlanta Hawks
| NBA
| 16 || 5.8 || .550 || .000 || .000 || 1.5 || .1 || .1 || .3 || 1.4
|-
| align="left" | 2009–10
| align="left" | Atlanta Hawks
| NBA
| 7 || 4.7 || .333 || .000 || .750 || 1.7 || .0 || .0 || .1 || 1.6
|-
| align="left" | 2010–11
| align="left" | Dinamo Sassari
| LBA
| 33 || 32.1 || .578 || .091 || .760 || 7.8 || .6 || 2.3 || .7 || 14.9
|-
| align="left" | 2011–12
| align="left" | Shandong Gold Lions
| CBA
| 33 || 31.1 || .572 || .300 || .673 || 11.7 || .9 || 1.4 || .5 || 17.0
|-
| align="left" | 2012–13
| align="left" | Jiangsu Steel Dragons
| CBA
| 13 || 40.3 || .488 || .328 || .684 || 13.9 || 2.6 || 2.3 || .5 || 23.9
|-
| align="left" | 2013–14
| align="left" | Montepaschi
| EuroLeague
| 10 || 20.8 || .492 || .250 || .500 || 6.7 || .5 || .3 || 1.1 || 6.3 
|-
| align="left" | 2014–15
| align="left" | Olympiacos B.C.
| EuroLeague
| 29 || 19.0 || .615 || .000 || .625 || 4.8 || .6 || .4 || .4 || 8.2 
|-
| align="left" | 2015–16
| align="left" | Olympiacos B.C.
| EuroLeague
| 22 || 21.1 || .567 || .000 || .643 || 6.0 || .5 || .7 || .3 || 9.4
|-
| align="left" | 2016–17
| align="left" | Real Madrid
| EuroLeague
| 35 || 16.4 || .645 || .000 || .683 || 4.5 || .6 || .5 || .3 || 7.6 
|-
| align="left" | 2017–18
| align="left" | CSKA Moscow
| EuroLeague
| 30 || 16.4 || .615 || .000 || .743|| 5.5 || .7 || .9|| .3 || 8.2
|-
| style="text-align:left | 2018–19
| align="left" | CSKA Moscow
| EuroLeague
| 36 ||  17.9 || .596 || .000 || .727 || 4.3 || .9 || .5 || .4 || 7.7 
|-
| style="text-align:left | 2019–20
| align="left" | Maccabi Tel Aviv B.C.
| Israeli League
| 16 || 21.3 || .653 || .000 || .615 || 6.6 || 1.9 || .3 || .4 || 11.4 
|- class="sortbottom"
|-
|-class=sortbottom
| align="center" colspan=2 | Career
| All Leagues
| 280 || 21.4 || .579 || .284 || .690 || 6.4 || .8 || .9 || .4 || 10.3

References

External links
 
 Othello Hunter at acb.com 
 Othello Hunter at draftexpress.com
 Othello Hunter at espn.com
 Othello Hunter at eurobasket.com
 Othello Hunter at euroleague.net
 Othello Hunter at legabasket.it 
 Othello Hunter at esake.gr 
 Othello Hunter at nba.com

1986 births
Living people
21st-century African-American sportspeople
African-American basketball players
American expatriate basketball people in China
American expatriate basketball people in Germany
American expatriate basketball people in Greece
American expatriate basketball people in Israel
American expatriate basketball people in Italy
American expatriate basketball people in Russia
American expatriate basketball people in Spain
American expatriate basketball people in Ukraine
American men's basketball players
Anaheim Arsenal players
Atlanta Hawks players
Basketball players from Winston-Salem, North Carolina
BC Azovmash players
Centers (basketball)
CB Valladolid players
Dinamo Sassari players
FC Bayern Munich basketball players
Greek Basket League players
Hillsborough Hawks men's basketball players
Ilysiakos B.C. players
Jiangsu Dragons players
Liberian men's basketball players
Liga ACB players
Maccabi Tel Aviv B.C. players
Mens Sana Basket players
Ohio State Buckeyes men's basketball players
Olympiacos B.C. players
PBC CSKA Moscow players
Power forwards (basketball)
Real Madrid Baloncesto players
Shandong Hi-Speed Kirin players
Undrafted National Basketball Association players
20th-century African-American sportspeople